Donald William Campbell (July 12, 1925 — December 20, 2012) was a Canadian ice hockey centre that played 17 games in the National Hockey League for the Chicago Black Hawks during the 1943–44 season. The rest of his career, which lasted from 1943 to 1954, was spent in the minor leagues. He later served as Superintendent of Parks and Recreation for the District of West Vancouver.

Born in Drumheller, Alberta, Campbell was the brother of Alberta politician, John Murray Campbell. He died in 2012.

Career statistics

Regular season and playoffs

References

External links
 

1925 births
2012 deaths
Calgary Stampeders (ice hockey) players
Canadian ice hockey centres
Chicago Blackhawks players
Ice hockey people from Alberta
Kimberley Dynamiters players
People from Drumheller
Portage Terriers players
Portland Eagles players
Seattle Ironmen players